The Saqqara ostracon is an ostracon, an Egyptian antiquity tracing to the period of Djoser (2650 BC),

Excavation

It was excavated in or near 1925, in Djoser's Pyramid, in Saqqara, Egypt.

Description

It is an apparently complete flake made of limestone. It is 15 × 17.5 × 5 cm, . In a few places, small portions of the surface seem to have been scaled away. It appears to date to the period of Djoser (~2650 BC).

Units written about

The ostracon has mentioned several units: :

 Cubits
 Palms
 Fingers

The curve

The curve appears catenary,

See also

 Ancient Egyptian units of measurement
 Ancient Egyptian mathematics
 Ancient Egyptian technology

References

Ancient Egyptian science
Egyptian mathematics
Ancient Egyptian technology
Ostracon